The 2014 SMT Shipping Topklasse cricket season is contested between eight teams playing in one single division. The competition will take place in two phases. In Phase I the teams will play an entire competition meeting each other two times while in phase II the top four and the bottom four will meet each other one time during a half competition. The competition will end with a "best out of three" final.

As a result of the 2013 competition, VOC Rotterdam has been promoted from Hoofdklasse (Dutch 2nd level cricket division) while HBS Craeyenhout has been relegated.

Teams
A total of 8 teams are taking part in the league

Group stage

Last updated 5 May 2014.

Color legend

May

References

External links
  Official Website - Match schedule

Cricket in the Netherlands
SMT Shipping Topklasse
SMT Shipping Topklasse